The Archdiocese (Metropolitan) of Ho Chi Minh City (former Saigon; ,) is a Roman Catholic ecclesiastical territory in the south of Vietnam. It is the biggest by population in the country.

The renaming of the former Archdiocese of Saigon to the Archdiocese of Ho Chi Minh city was declared on November 23, 1976. The suffragan dioceses are: 
 Diocese of Bà Rịa
 Diocese of Cần Thơ
 Diocese of Đà Lạt 
 Diocese of Long Xuyên
 Diocese of Mỹ Tho
 Diocese of Phan Thiết
 Diocese of Phú Cường
 Diocese of Vĩnh Long
 Diocese of Xuân Lộc.

Immaculate Conception Cathedral Basilica (Vương cung thánh đường Chính tòa Đức Mẹ Vô nhiễm Nguyên tội - Nhà thờ Đức Bà Sài Gòn) in Ho Chi Minh City has been assigned as the cathedral of the archdiocese. There are also Saint Francis Xavier Church, Jeanne d'Arc Church, Saint Joseph Church, Sacred Heart Church, Saint Philip Church, Tân Định Church.

By 2004, the Metropolitan Archdiocese of Ho Chi Minh city had about 602,478 believers (11.0% of the population), 519 priests and 195 parishes.

The Metropolitan Archdiocese of Ho Chi Minh city is a "sister" diocese of the Roman Catholic Archdiocese of Los Angeles (United States) since 2008.

The archdiocese ministers often take part in international exchanges and contacts, though with special permission of the Vietnamese authorities.

The young Catholics from the Metropolitan Archdiocese of Ho Chi Minh city and Archdiocese of Hanoi formed in 2006 an organization for helping children in rural and underdeveloped areas of Vietnam. The Metropolitan Archdiocese of Ho Chi Minh City regularly organizes special mass events including the Youth Day in December 2007, which was attended by more than 7 000 young people, who take part in volunteer and charitable activities, and two prayer vigils "God is rich in compassion" in March 2008 with the participation of several thousand faithful.

There is a center of social work organized by the Metropolitan Archdiocese of Ho Chi Minh city, which consists of priests, laypeople and members of civil groups. The center is occupied with three main problems: helping street children, activities to reduce HIV/AIDS level and help its victims, social and psychological work with prostitutes to get them off the streets.

Cathedral 
Notre Dame Cathedral in Ho Chi Minh City is considered to be one of the main city attractions and one of the most beautiful buildings in all Vietnam. It was built from 1877 to 1880 by the French architect J. Bourad, has a Neo-Romanesque façade with twin towers and a statue of the Virgin Mary in the center front.

Ordinaries

Apostolic Vicars of Western Cochin 
 Dominique Lefèbvre, MEP (11 March 1844 – 28 August 1864)
 Jean-Claude Miche, MEP (9 September 1864 – 1 December 1873)
 Isidore-François-Joseph Colombert, MEP (1 December 1873 – 31 December 1894)
 Jean-Marie Dépierre, MEP (12 April 1895 – 17 October 1898)
 Lucien-Emile Mossard, MEP (11 February 1899 – 12 February 1920)
 Victor-Charles Quinton, MEP (11 February 1920 – 4 October 1924)

Apostolic Vicars of Sài Gòn 
 Isidore-Marie-Joseph Dumortier, MEP (17 December 1925 – 16 February 1940)
 Jean Cassaigne, MEP (20 February 1941 – 20 September 1955)
 Simon Hòa Nguyễn Văn Hiền (20 September 1955 – 24 November 1960)

Archbishops of Ho Chi Minh City 
From 1960 to 1976, the archbishop was titled Archbishop of Saigon.
 Paul Nguyễn Văn Bình (24 November 1960 – 1 July 1995)
 François-Xavier Nguyễn Văn Thuận (Coadjutor Archbishop: 24 April 1975 - 24 November 1994)
 Nicolas Huỳnh Văn Nghi (Apostolic administrator: 8 August 1993 – 1 March 1998)
 Jean-Baptiste Phạm Minh Mẫn (1 March 1998 – 22 March 2014) (made Cardinal in 2003)
 Paul Bùi Văn Đọc (22 March 2014 – 6 March 2018)
 Joseph Đỗ Mạnh Hùng (Apostolic administrator: 8 March 2018 – 19 October 2019)
 Joseph Nguyễn Năng (19 October 2019 – )

Auxiliary Bishops 
 François-Xavier Trần Thanh Khâm (14 October 1965 - 2 October 1976)
 Nicolas Huỳnh Văn Nghi (1 July 1974 - 19 March 1975), appointed Apostolic Administrator and then Bishop of Phan Thiết (later appointed Apostolic Administrator here)
 Aloisius Phạm Văn Nẫm (3 December 1977 - 30 September 1999)
 Joseph Vũ Duy Thống (4 July 2001 - 25 July 2009), appointed Bishop of Phan Thiết
 Pierre Nguyễn Văn Khảm (15 October 2008 - 26 July 2014), appointed Bishop of Mỹ Tho
 Joseph Đỗ Mạnh Hùng (25 June 2016 - 3 December 2019), was concurrently Apostolic Administrator until appointed as Bishop of Phan Thiết
 Louis Nguyễn Anh Tuấn (25 August 2017 - ), concurrently Apostolic Administrator of the Diocese of Hà Tĩnh
 Joseph Bùi Công Trác (1 November 2022 - )

See also 
 Saigon Notre-Dame Basilica
 Roman Catholicism in Vietnam
 Tân Định Church

References

External links
  
  

Ho Chi Minh City
Ho Chi Minh City
Ho Chi Minh City